Frederick Charles Freeman (born September 12, 1989) is an American-Canadian professional baseball first baseman for the Los Angeles Dodgers of Major League Baseball (MLB). Previously, Freeman played for the Atlanta Braves for 12 seasons. He made his MLB debut in 2010 and is a six-time MLB All-Star. Freeman won a Gold Glove Award in 2018, the Silver Slugger Award in 2019, 2020 and 2021, and the National League's Most Valuable Player Award in 2020. Freeman won the 2021 World Series over the Houston Astros as a member of the Braves. After 12 seasons with the Braves, he entered free agency and then signed a six-year, $162 million contract with the Dodgers.

Early life
Freeman was born in Fountain Valley, California. Both of Freeman's parents are from Ontario, Canada. His mother was from Peterborough, while his father is from Windsor. Because Freeman's parents were both born in Canada, Freeman holds Canadian citizenship in addition to American citizenship.

Freeman grew up a fan of the Los Angeles Angels. At age six, he practiced with Little League ballplayers from Orange, California, who were older. Aged seven, he was placed on a team of nine-year-olds. When Freeman himself turned nine, he was assigned to play with 12-year-olds. Freeman attended El Modena High School, where he was a third baseman and a pitcher. As a senior in 2007, Freeman hit for a .417 batting average and had a 6–1 win–loss record as a pitcher. The Orange County Register named him its 2007 player of the year. He signed a letter of intent with California State University, Fullerton to play college baseball for the Cal State Fullerton Titans.

Professional career

Atlanta Braves

Draft and minor leagues
The Atlanta Braves selected Freeman in the second round, with the 78th overall selection, of the 2007 MLB draft. Freeman signed with the team for $409,500, forgoing his college scholarship. He made his professional debut with the Gulf Coast Braves in 2007 and played for the Rome Braves of the Class A South Atlantic League in 2008. He was named the Braves' fifth-best prospect according to Baseball America before the 2009 season. 

Freeman started the 2009 season with the Myrtle Beach Pelicans of the Class A-Advanced Carolina League and was promoted to the Mississippi Braves of the Class AA Southern League during the season. Baseball America ranked Freeman the 11th-best prospect overall in their 2009 mid-season top 25. In August 2009, he suffered a wrist injury. After the 2009 season ended, Freeman joined the Peoria Saguaros of the Arizona Fall League. He began the 2010 season with the Gwinnett Braves of the Class AAA International League.

2010
Freeman was called up to the Braves on September 1, 2010, as part of the team's September call-ups, and made his MLB debut that same day. On September 5, 2010, he got his first career MLB hit off Florida Marlins pitcher Clay Hensley, and on September 21, 2010, he hit his first MLB home run off Philadelphia Phillies pitcher Roy Halladay. He played 20 games with the Braves and batted .167. Freeman was not a part of the Braves' playoff roster. He returned to the Arizona Fall League, this time to play for the Phoenix Desert Dogs.

2011
Freeman began the 2011 season as the starting first baseman for the Braves. After a slow start, his performance improved and he had been mentioned as a strong candidate for rookie of the year. On July 4, 2011, Freeman hit two home runs against the Colorado Rockies, for his first multi-home run game. Freeman was the first Braves rookie to reach 50 RBIs by July 18 since Hank Aaron accomplished this feat in 1954. He was named NL rookie of the month for July; during that month, Freeman led all Major League rookies with 38 hits, a .362 batting average, and a.433 on-base percentage in 27 games. He also led all NL rookies with six homers and 17 runs. His 18 RBIs tied for the most in the NL among rookies.

In August, Freeman and Dan Uggla became the first members of the Braves to have concurrent twenty game hitting streaks in the modern era. Freeman's streak ended at 20 games on August 7. Freeman finished the 2011 year batting .282 with 32 doubles, 21 home runs, and 76 RBI in 157 games played.

Freeman finished second to teammate Craig Kimbrel in the NL Rookie of the Year balloting. Kimbrel and Freeman were the first teammates to finish first and second since 1989, when the Chicago Cubs' Jerome Walton and Dwight Smith came in first and second. The only other time two Braves finished in the top five, the organization was still located in Milwaukee—Gene Conley was voted third-best rookie of the 1954 season; Hank Aaron came in fourth.

2012
In 2012, Freeman had an NL-leading nine sacrifice flies along with batting .259 with 33 doubles, 23 home runs, and 94 RBI in 147 games played.

2013
In 2013, Freeman was selected as a finalist for the 2013 Major League Baseball All-Star Game Final Vote, where he won with a record-setting total of 19.7 million fan votes, but was unable to play because of a thumb injury suffered three days prior to the game. Freeman finished the 2013 season with a .319 batting average, along with 23 homers and 109 RBI in 147 games played. He finished fifth on the National League Most Valuable Player award voting.

2014

On February 4, 2014, Freeman agreed to an eight-year, $135 million extension. Freeman was named an All-Star for the second time in 2014, and played the last three innings of the game. He led the team in batting average and on base plus slugging percentage in 2014. Freeman also set a franchise record for innings played. During a game against the Philadelphia Phillies on June 27, 2014, Freeman hit a three-run homer off Kyle Kendrick to left center field caught by broadcaster Tom McCarthy. Freeman finished the 2014 year by appearing in all 162 games batting .288 with 90 walks, 43 doubles, 18 home runs, and 78 RBI.

2015
On June 17, 2015, Freeman was listed as day-to-day with an injury to his right wrist originally sustained during a June 13 game against the New York Mets. He missed the June 18 game against the Boston Red Sox, ending a streak of 234 consecutive games played, which led the majors at the time. Freeman was officially placed on the 15-day disabled list on June 23, and received a platelet-rich plasma injection soon afterward. He was eligible for activation on July 3, but did not return to action until July 28, three days after he was removed from the disabled list. For the season, Freeman hit for a .276 batting average with 18 home runs and 66 RBIs in 118 games, his shortest season since 2011.

2016
General manager John Coppolella had assumed responsibility for the team's transactions since the 2014–15 off-season, and played a large role in the Braves' rebuild, having traded away many players. However, during the 2015–16 off-season, Coppolella repeatedly stated he would not trade Freeman. At the beginning of the 2016 season, Freeman was expected to lead the team on the field, despite the wrist injury last year adversely affecting his off-season preparations. Freeman had a difficult start to the season, although began hitting well in June. On June 15, Freeman hit his first career cycle in a 9–8 victory against the Cincinnati Reds. He was named National League Player of the Week soon after that performance. Freeman recorded his first 30-home run season in 2016, on September 13, shortly after claiming his second Player of the Week award in the 2016 season. That day he also drove in the 500th run of his career. On September 29, Freeman's 30-game hitting streak, which had begun on August 24, was halted with an 0–4 night against the Philadelphia Phillies. It had been a part of a larger 46-game run of getting on base, which also ended. During the penultimate week of the regular season, Freeman again was recognized as Player of the Week, and named the September National League Player of the Month at the end of the year. Overall in 2016, Freeman played 158 games with a .302 batting average, 43 doubles, 34 home runs, and 91 RBI. For the season, he led all major league hitters in line drive percentage (29.1%). He finished sixth on the National League Most Valuable Player award voting.

2017

Freeman represented Canada at the 2017 World Baseball Classic, something he had always wanted to do. He was the starting first baseman on Opening Day against the New York Mets, going 3–4, including a triple. In the first game at SunTrust Park, Freeman doubled in a couple runs. He continued to tear up Padres pitching, hitting three homers in the series. On April 19 against the Washington Nationals, he set a franchise record for most consecutive plate appearances to get on base with a solo homer.

On May 17, Freeman was hit by a pitch from Aaron Loup of Toronto, resulting in him leaving the game. An MRI and CT scan later revealed a non-displaced wrist fracture in his left hand, ruling him out for up to 10 weeks. At the time, Freeman was an early candidate for the MVP award, leading the league in home runs with 14, and ranking second in both on-base and slugging percentage.

While rehabilitating his hand injury, Freeman stated in June 2017 that he offered to play third base upon his return, because his replacement at first base, Matt Adams, was hitting well. On July 1, Freeman appeared with the Triple-A Gwinnett Braves on a rehab assignment in which he played third base. Three days later, he returned to Atlanta, and started at third base against the Houston Astros. Freeman recorded his 1,000th career hit in a game against the Washington Nationals on July 6. Braves manager Brian Snitker stated in August that Freeman would no longer play third base regularly, as injuries to other players necessitated late-season promotions and allowed Freeman to return to first base.

Freeman finished the season batting .307 with 28 home runs and 71 RBIs despite only playing in 117 games, his lowest total since 2010. He led the Braves in home runs, batting average, and was second in RBIs.

2018
Freeman underwent LASIK surgery in October 2017, to correct vision problems that had manifested since 2012.
He was selected to his third All Star game as the National League's starting first baseman. He also accepted an invitation to participate in the 2018 Home Run Derby.

Freeman finished the regular season as the National League leader in base hits with 191. Only Whit Merrifield had more in Major League Baseball. He also finished as the Braves' team leader in batting average (.309), on base percentage (.388), slugging percentage (.505), doubles (44), walks (76), and RBIs (98). For the season, he led all major league hitters in line drive percentage (32.3%).

Freeman, along with Anthony Rizzo of the Chicago Cubs, won the 2018 Gold Glove for first base in the National League. Freeman's teammates Ender Inciarte and Nick Markakis won the same award for center field and right field, respectively, marking the first time that three Atlanta Braves had won the honor in the same season. Additionally, Freeman received the 2018 Wilson Defensive Player of the Year Award and finished fourth on the National League Most Valuable Player award voting.

2019
At midseason, Freeman was selected the National League starter at first base in the 2019 Major League Baseball All-Star Game. The appearance was his second consecutive start in the game and his fourth All-Star Game selection overall.

In 2019 Freeman batted .295/.389/.549 with 38 home runs and 121 RBIs, and led NL hitters in line drive percentage (27.5%). Freeman and teammates Ronald Acuña Jr. and Ozzie Albies won the 2019 National League Silver Slugger Awards for first base, outfield, and second base, respectively. Freeman won the Wilson Defensive Player of the Year Award for the second consecutive season.

On October 18, it was revealed that Freeman underwent right elbow surgery to remove a bone spur. Freeman confessed that the spur had bothered him within recent years, and the injury was first discovered on September 13.

2020
Freeman tested positive for COVID-19 in July 2020, before the season began. He was one of the few symptomatic MLB patients with a high fever and loss of smell. He recovered in time to participate in some training camp activities, held before the shortened season's Opening Day. Freeman hit his first career grand slam on September 4, in the second game of a doubleheader against the Washington Nationals off pitcher Tanner Rainey. Two days later, he hit another grand slam, against Nationals pitcher Kyle Finnegan. On September 9, Freeman reached 1,500 career hits with a home run. During that same game against the Miami Marlins, he set a career high by driving in six runs.

Freeman finished the shortened 60-game regular season hitting .341/.462/.640 with 13 home runs and 53 RBIs. He led the major leagues with 23 doubles and 51 runs scored. Freeman's offensive performance won him a second Silver Slugger Award. He was named the NL MVP, becoming the first Braves player to win the award since Chipper Jones in 1999. Freeman was also voted the Baseball Digest MLB Player of the Year, Baseball America Player of the Year, MLBPA Player's Choice Player of the Year, and MLBPA Player's Choice NL Outstanding Player. Freeman was awarded the 2020 National League Hank Aaron Award, becoming the second player in franchise history to win the award, following Andruw Jones in 2005.

2021
Freeman was named the National League's starting first baseman for the 2021 All-Star Game.

On August 18, 2021, Freeman hit for the cycle against the Miami Marlins. This was the fourth time an Atlanta Braves player had ever done so, the second time Freeman has done it, and only the ninth time in Braves' history. Freeman owned a season-low .195 batting average on May 7. His second career cycle improved his batting average to .301. Freeman finished the 2021 season with a .300 batting average, a .896 OPS, and 31 home runs. The 2021 Braves became the second team in Major League Baseball history to have each starting infielder hit at least 25 home runs in a season. On October 12, 2021, Freeman hit an eventual game winning solo home run in the bottom of the eighth inning in a tied National League Division Series game four against the Milwaukee Brewers. This home run in what was previously a 4–4 ballgame allowed the Braves to advance to the National League Championship Series for the second consecutive year. 

The Braves faced the Houston Astros in the 2021 World Series. In game five, Freeman hit a home run that traveled 460 feet. The Braves defeated the Astros in six games, making Freeman a World Series champion. Freeman recorded the final putout of the Series. At the end of the season, Freeman received his third consecutive Silver Slugger Award and his first Babe Ruth Award. Freeman joined Hank Aaron and Johnny Evers as the only Braves to win a World Series and an MVP award.

Los Angeles Dodgers
2021 was the last year of Freeman's contract with the Braves, and he was widely expected to remain with the Braves. Freeman himself had stated a desire to remain with the Braves for his whole career. Freeman and the Braves had exchanged offers for a new contract during the 2021 season, including a five-year, $125 million offer the Braves made before the trade deadline. Freeman declined the Braves' qualifying offer following the 2021 season and became a free agent for the first time in his career. During the offseason, the Braves reportedly increased their longstanding offer to five-years and $140 million, but Freeman and his agent insisted on a sixth year. Freeman's agent gave the Braves an ultimatum, offering them two proposals and giving them one hour to accept one of the offers. The Braves declined the two proposals and pulled their longstanding offer off the table. The following day, the Braves acquired first baseman Matt Olson from the Oakland Athletics, and then signed Olson to an eight-year deal, effectively closing the door on Freeman's tenure as a Brave. 

Other teams had been pursuing Freeman during the offseason, including the Dodgers, and with no future in Atlanta, Freeman opted to return to his home in Southern California. On March 18, 2022, Freeman signed a six-year, $162 million contract with the Los Angeles Dodgers.

2022
Freeman made his Dodgers debut on April 8, 2022, batting second in the lineup and going 1–3 with a walk against the Colorado Rockies. On April 18, 2022, before a game between the Dodgers and the Atlanta Braves at Dodger Stadium, Freeman was presented his 2021 Silver Slugger Award, with Braves manager Brian Snitker and hitting coach Kevin Seitzer attending the ceremony. In the ensuing game, Freeman hit his first home run as a Dodger in what was also his first career at-bat against his former team. Freeman was presented his World Series ring before the Dodgers played the Braves at Truist Park on June 24. Several days later, Freeman fired his agent and management team, which some analysts viewed as related to the contract negotiations that led to his departing Atlanta, though it was later reported that Freeman had retained the same agency's services. He was named an All-Star on July 17, replacing Starling Marte on the National League roster. 

In 159 games in 2022, Freeman led the MLB with 199 hits and 47 doubles, and led the majors in line drive percentage (27.5%). His batting average was second in the National League at .325 and he had 21 home runs and 100 RBI.

Profile
Freeman's powerful swing, in which he moves his shoulders slightly before lowering his hands, has been described as "unorthodox" and compared to a tennis forehand. His hand-eye coordination and ability to adjust to pitchers from one plate appearance to the next have also drawn praise.

He has had press coverage as a result of needing to wear glasses while competing professionally, until switching these for contact lenses, and repaired vision with Lasik surgery.

Freeman's propensity to strike up conversations with opposing baserunners has been noted by several rival players. Freeman was described by Braves manager Brian Snitker as "my rock" and "everything that the Braves stand for."

Personal life
Freeman is the son of Fredrick and Rosemary Freeman, both Canadian. Rosemary died of melanoma when Freeman was 10; Freeman always wears a long-sleeved shirt during games to honor her memory. Freeman has two older brothers, Andrew and Phillip, and is a sixth generation Salvationist. His cousin Carson Branstine is a tennis player.

Freeman married Chelsea Goff in 2014. Goff appeared in season 8, episode 15 of Say Yes to the Dress: Atlanta. The couple has three sons. While he played for the Braves, Freeman and his family lived in Atlanta during baseball season and in California during the off-season. Shortly after signing with the Dodgers, he commuted to Dodger Stadium from Corona del Mar and planned to maintain his Atlanta residence. Later, he began renting a home in Studio City.

During a 2014 winter storm, Freeman was stuck in a traffic jam that was not moving. Freeman stayed stuck for hours until former teammate Chipper Jones arrived on his ATV and rescued Freeman. In January 2016, the Atlanta Braves announced a "Chipper Rescues Freddie" bobblehead night for the following season. This was used as a promotional night for the franchise.

See also

 Atlanta Braves award winners and league leaders
 List of Major League Baseball annual doubles leaders
 List of Major League Baseball annual putouts leaders
 List of Major League Baseball annual runs scored leaders
 List of Major League Baseball career assists as a first baseman leaders
 List of Major League Baseball career home run leaders
 List of Major League Baseball career games played as a first baseman leaders
 List of Major League Baseball career OPS leaders
 List of Major League Baseball career slugging percentage leaders
 List of Major League Baseball players to hit for the cycle

References

External links

1989 births
Living people
American sportspeople of Canadian descent
Atlanta Braves players
Baseball players from California
Gold Glove Award winners
Gulf Coast Braves players
Gwinnett Braves players
Los Angeles Dodgers players
Major League Baseball first basemen
Mississippi Braves players
Myrtle Beach Pelicans players
National League All-Stars
National League Most Valuable Player Award winners
Peoria Saguaros players
Phoenix Desert Dogs players
Rome Braves players
World Baseball Classic players of Canada
2017 World Baseball Classic players
2023 World Baseball Classic players
Silver Slugger Award winners
Citizens of Canada through descent